Dialogue was an art magazine founded and published in Akron, and later Columbus, Ohio.  It covered the arts of Ohio, Michigan, Indiana, western Pennsylvania, Kentucky and northern Illinois.  Founded in 1978 by the artist Don Harvey and museum executive and former Artforum editor John Coplans, it began having financial troubles in 2002, changed hands, and ceased publication entirely in June 2004.

References

External links 
"Midwest Art Mags Struggling", Art in America,  July 2002  by Susan Snodgrass

Visual arts magazines published in the United States
Defunct magazines published in the United States
Magazines established in 1978
Magazines disestablished in 2004
Magazines published in Ohio
Mass media in Columbus, Ohio